1,1,1,3,3-Pentafluoropropane (HFC-245fa) is a hydrofluorocarbon is a colorless gas used primarily for closed-cell spray foam insulation. HFC-245fa is also known as pentafluoropropane and by its chemical name 1,1,1,3,3-pentafluoropropane.

Environmental Effects

Unlike CFC and HCFC blowing agents formerly used for this purpose, it has no ozone depletion potential and is nearly non-toxic.  Although it is intended to remain trapped within the foam insulation, it is practically non-biodegradable with a lifetime of 7.2 years when it eventually does escape into the atmosphere.  It does have a high global warming potential of 950 (950 times the global warming effect of ).  Honeywell refers to this as "acceptable" in their literature, but they don't include the actual number.

Economics
One of the disadvantages of R-245fa is its cost.  In 2000, R-141b cost one US dollar per pound, whereas R-245fa cost $2.50 to $4.00 per pound.  As of 2007, and prior to Sinochem's production it was already a high volume production chemical, with over 1 million pounds produced annually.

Manufacturing History
Pentafluoropropane is produced by Honeywell and in Asia by Sinochem.  Honeywell markets HFC-245fa under the Enovate and Genetron 245fa brand names. AlliedSignal, who adopted the Honeywell name after acquiring it, decided in 1999 to provide a non ozone depleting blowing agent as an alternative for dichlorofluoroethane (HCFC-141b) and trichlorofluoromethane (CFC-11).  Competitors Atofina and General Electric pursued strategies using other agents.

See also
Building insulation
Fiberglass
Honeywell

References

External links
Honeywell's Enovate Homepage
Housingzone.com Article about Solving Problems with Spray Foam

Insulators
Refrigerants
Fluoroalkanes